Mammillaria compressa, commonly called mother of hundreds, is a species of cactus in the subfamily Cactoideae. It is native to northern and southern Mexico, and is cultivated as an ornamental plant. It blooms in the winter and early spring, with bell-shaped flowers that range from a purplish pink to red color. Its curved spines were traditionally used as hooks for fishing.

Gallery

References

Plants described in 1828
compressa